When Thieves Fall Out is a 1916 American short silent crime drama film, directed by Jack Harvey. It stars Harry Benham, Sidney Bracey, and Sonia Marcelle.

References

External links
When Thieves Fall Out at the Internet Movie Database

1916 films
American silent short films
American crime drama films
1916 crime drama films
Films directed by Jack Harvey
American black-and-white films
1910s American films
Silent American drama films
American drama short films